Adevildo De Marchi (16 March 1894 – 20 May 1965) was an Italian footballer who played as a forward. He competed for Italy in the men's football tournament at the 1920 Summer Olympics.

References

1894 births
1965 deaths
Italian footballers
Italy international footballers
Olympic footballers of Italy
Footballers at the 1920 Summer Olympics
Footballers from Genoa
Association football forwards
Genoa C.F.C. players